is a national highway connecting Asahikawa and Wakkanai in Hokkaidō, Japan.

Route data
Length: 243.0 km (151.0 mi)
Origin: Asahikawa, Hokkaidō (originates at the terminus of 12 and the origin of 39)
Terminus: Wakkanai, Hokkaidō (ends at Wakkanai Station)

History
1952-12-04 - First Class National Highway 40 (from Asahikawa to Wakkanai)
1965-04-01 - General National Highway 40 (from Asahikawa to Wakkanai)

Overlapping sections
From Shibetsu (Odori East-6 intersection) to Nayoro (West-4 North-1 intersection): Route 239 
From Bifuka (Odori Kita-3 intersection) to Otoineppu: Route 275 
From Teshio to the terminus: Route 232

References

040
Roads in Hokkaido